Malika Zarra is a Moroccan singer, composer, and music producer, based in New York City. She is known for singing in Moroccan Arabic, Berber, French, and English. Her music has been on the JazzWeek Top 20 radio chart in world music.

Biography
Zarra was born in Ouled Teima, the eldest of five children to a Berber mother from the High Atlas and a father from Tata. Her family moved to Paris when she was young, but remained culturally Moroccan in the home. In school, she studied clarinet. She became interested in jazz because it was similar to Arabic traditional music in the core importance of improvisation. Eventually, she studied at the jazz conservatories at Tours and Marseilles and studied privately with Sarah Lazarus and Françoise Galais. On the Paris scene, she appeared at venues including Festival L'esprit Jazz de St Germain, Sunside/Sunset, and Cité de la Musique. She started to draw serious attention by singing jazz standards to her own Arabic translations.

Subsequently, she performed or recorded with John Zorn, Makoto Ozone, Tommy Campbell, Will Calhoun, Lonnie Plaxico, Michael Cain, Brad Jones, Jacques Schwarz-Bart, David Gilmore, and Gretchen Parlato, among others.

She moved to New York City, eventually settling in Jersey City, in 2010, where she was signed on the Motéma Music label.

She has appeared at Carnegie Hall (opening for Bobby McFerrin), the London Jazz Festival, the Montreal Jazz Festival, the Opera House Lincoln Center, the Apollo Theater, the Festival du Monde Arabe, the Salzburg Jazz Festival, Festival Nuits d’Afrique Montreal, the Duke Ellington Jazz Festival, Brooklyn Maqam Festival, Blue Note Jazz Club, The Jazz Standard, Joe's Pub, Sob's (opening for Sara Tavares), Smoke Jazz Club, Brooklyn Academy of Music, Chorus Jazz Club, Porgy & Bess Jazz Club, Domicil Jazz Club, WDR 3, and Klub Cankarjevega Doma.

Music
Zarra's music is influenced by traditional Berber music, Gnawa music, Chaabi, French popular music, jazz, house, funk, dance, and traditional African music. Specific personal influences include Haja El Hamdaouia, Rais Mohand, Farid al-Atrash, Um Kalthoum, Warda Al-Jazairia, Ella Fitzgerald, Bobby McFerrin, Thelonious Monk, Stevie Wonder, and Aretha Franklin.

Her band includes Francis Jacob on acoustic and electric guitars, Brahim Fribgane on oud, cajón, bendir, tamtam, and darbuka, Michael Cain on piano, synthesizers, and Rhodes piano, Mamadou Ba on bass, Harvey Wirht on percussion, and Jasser Haj Youssef on viola and violin.

Discography

as leader
On the Ebony Road (CD Baby, 2006)
Berber Taxi (Motéma Music, 2011)

with Mycale
Mycale: Book of Angels Volume 13 (Tzadik, 2009)

as guest artist
 John Zorn - Nova Express (Tadzik, 2011)
 Marcin Wasilewski Trio - Faithful (ECM, 2011)
 Amy Lee - Aftermath (110 Records, Inc, 2014)

References

External links
Official Site
Malika Zarra on All About Jazz
NPR review

Moroccan emigrants to France
Moroccan emigrants to the United States
Living people
Moroccan musicians
Year of birth missing (living people)
American people of Moroccan-Berber descent
Motéma Music artists